University of the Frontier or UFRO is a public university in Temuco, Araucanía Region, Chile. It is a derivative university and part of the Chilean Traditional Universities. UFRO boasts a student body with a variety of abilities and from a variety of backgrounds, many of them are Mapuche descent.

Facilities
The university owns a property called Rucamanque, that is used for research, environmental education, and conservation. Rucamanque holds old-growth and second-growth forest.

Notable alumni 

 Pedro Cayuqueo, Mapuche activist and journalist
 Gloria Dünkler, writer and recipient of the 2016 Pablo Neruda Award
Natividad Llanquileo, attorney, Mapuche activist, and member of the Chilean Constitutional Convention (2021-present)

 Elisa Loncón, academic, Mapuche activist, and President of the Chilean Constitutional Convention (2021-present)
 Andrea Parra, member of the Chamber of Deputies of Chile (2018-present) and former Governor of the Malleco Province (2014-2016)

References

 
La Frontera
Education in La Araucanía Region
Educational institutions established in 1981
Forestry education
1981 establishments in Chile
Buildings and structures in La Araucanía Region